Night Game is the third title in the Ghostwalker Series of paranormal romances by Christine Feehan.

The novel appeared on several bestseller lists including those of The New York Times, Publishers Weekly and USA Today.

Plot introduction
Gator Fontenot of the Special Forces paranormal squad can't refuse an urgent response to save the elusive Iris "Flame" Johnson, a victim of the same horrific experiments that warped Gator. Now unleashed, she's a flame-haired weapon of unimaginable destructive powers, a walking time bomb bent on revenge in the sultry bayous of New Orleans, and hunted by a shadowy assassin. It's Gator's job to reel Iris in.

But can two people haunted by violent betrayals trust the passion that soon ignites between them? Or is one of them just playing another seductive and deadly night game?

See also

Shadow Game
Mind Game
Conspiracy Game
Deadly Game

References

2005 American novels
Novels by Christine Feehan
Novels set in New Orleans
American romance novels